Pleasant Valley, is a ghost town, a historical mining town, and a former populated place in White Pine County, Nevada.  There was a post office from March 1892 until April 1894.

In 1997, there were 8 families associated with the Apostolic United Brethren living at Pleasant Valley. The settlement was abandoned sometime after 2004.

See also
 1915 Pleasant Valley earthquake - named for Pleasant Valley in Pershing County, Nevada
 Pleasant Valley, Nevada - a very small unincorporated community in Washoe County

References 

Ghost towns in White Pine County, Nevada
Ghost towns in Nevada